Édouard Niermans may refer to:

 Édouard Niermans (director) (born 1943), French film director, screenwriter and actor
 Édouard Niermans (architect) (1859–1928), French architect of Dutch origins